The imagineNATIVE Film + Media Arts Festival is the world's largest Indigenous film and media arts festival, held annually in Toronto in the month of October. The festival focuses on the film, video, radio, and new media work of Indigenous, Aboriginal and First Peoples from around the world. The festival includes screenings, parties, panel discussions, and cultural events.

As an organization, imagineNATIVE supports the creation of new works through their commissioning program, and national outreach to and for Indigenous communities through various off-site programs throughout the year. ImagineNative also commissions industry reports on the status of Indigenous film production in Canada.

History
The festival was founded in 1998 by Cynthia Lickers-Sage in her capacity as the Aboriginal outreach coordinator for Vtape as a venue for the exhibition of short film and video work by Aboriginal artists. While initially operated through Vtape, the festival subsequently became an independent organization. An early programmer for the festival was Ojibway critic and journalist Jesse Wente,  who continued in his role as programmer through 2010. In 2010, Jason Ryle took on the role of the festival's executive director; he was succeeded in 2020 by Naomi Johnson. Ryle was subsequently named the winner of the Toronto Film Critics Association's Clyde Gilmour Award for his contributions to the Canadian film industry.

Awards 
The 2001 winner for Best Film went to Atanarjuat: The Fast Runner by Inuit filmmaker Zacharias Kunuk. This film was the first feature dramatic film in an Indigenous language by an Inuit director.

The 2016 festival focused on Inuit and northern films, with a special focus on films from Greenland. Award winners for that year included Bonfire, a film by Russian Sakha director Dmitry Davydov, for Best Dramatic Feature; Searchers (Maliglutit) by Zacharias Kunuk for Best Indigenous Language Production; and Angry Inuk, directed by Alethea Arnaquq-Baril, which won Best Documentary Feature.

Audience Choice Award

Best Dramatic Feature

Best Short Drama

Best Canadian Short Drama (2006–2016)

Best Short Work (Cynthia Lickers-Sage Award, 2017–Present)

Best Indigenous Language Production

Kent Monkman Award: Best Experimental/Innovation in Storytelling

Best Documentary - Short Format 
{| class="wikitable"
!Year
!Film
!Director
!Ref
|-
|2005
|Wirriya (Small Boy)
|Beck Cole
|
|-
|2006
|Coureurs de nuit
|Shanouk Newashish
|
|-
|2007
|The Vanishing Trace
|Keesic Douglas
|
|-
|2008
|Le rêve d'une mère
|Cherilyn Papatie
|
|-
|2009
|How People Got Fire
|Christopher Auchter
|
|-
|2010
|Ne le dis pas (Do Not Tell)
|Jani Bellefleur-Kaltush
|
|-
|2011
|Spirit of the Bluebird
|Jesse Gouchey, Xstine Cook
|
|-
|2012
|Songline to Happiness
|Danny Teece-Johnson
|
|-
|2013
|Inuit Cree Reconciliation
|Neil Diamond, Zacharias Kunuk
|
|-
|2014
|Treading Water
|Janelle Wookey, Jérémie Wookey
|
|-
|2015
|Nowhere Land
|Bonnie Ammaq
|
|-
|2016
|Cree Code Talker
|Alexandra Lazarowich
|
|-
|2017
|Lelum'''
|Asia Longman
|
|-
|2018
|Fast Horse|Alexandra Lazarowich
|
|-
|2019
|The Boxers of Brule|Jesse Adler
|
|-
|2020
|êmîcêtôcêt: Many Bloodlines|Theola Ross
|
|-
|2021
|Mary Two-Axe Earley: I Am Indian Again|Courtney Montour
|
|-
|2022
|First Time Home|Noemi Librado-Sanchez, Esmirna Librado, Esmeralda Ventura, Heriberto Ventura
|
|}

 Best Documentary - Long Format (Alanis Obomsawin Award) 

 Best Music Video (2000–2016) 

 Best Radio (2000–2013) 

 Best Television (2000–2004) 

 Best New Media (2000–2014) 

 Best Audio Work (2014–Present) 

 Best Digital Media Work (2015–Present) 

 Best Interactive Work (2018–Present) 

 Emerging Talent (Cynthia Lickers-Sage & Jane Glassco Awards) 

 Best Youth (Ellen Monague Award) 

 Sun & Moon Jury Prizes 

August Schellenberg Award of Excellence
Named in memory of actor August Schellenberg, the August Schellenberg Award of Excellence is a lifetime achievement award honoring indigenous actors. The award was presented for the first time in 2015.

2015 - Tantoo Cardinal
2016 - Tom Jackson
2017 - Tina Keeper
2018 - Michael Greyeyes
2019 - Michelle Thrush
2020 - Lorne Cardinal
2021 - Shirley Cheechoo
2022 - Gary Farmer

 Commissions 

NFB/imagineNATIVE Interactive Partnership
NFB/imagineNATIVE Interactive Partnership was started in 2012 for the commissioning and production of new digital and interactive works by established Indigenous artists. Works produced through this program include De Nort (2012) by the ITWE Collective, Similkameen Crossroads (2013) by Tyler Hagan, Ice Fishing (2014) by Jordan Bennett and Red Card (2016) by Cara Mumford. Ice Fishing was subsequently selected to represent Canada at the 2015 Venice Biennale.

Stolen Sisters Digital Initiative

The Stolen Sisters Digital Initiative (SSDI) was a 2012 imagineNATIVE artistic commission and national exhibition of four, one-minute digital works by award-winning Canadian Indigenous filmmakers. The commissioned works were created to reflect and respond to the Stolen Sisters, a term adopted by the Aboriginal community and larger social justice organizations of the struggle to find answers for the hundreds of unsolved cases of missing and murdered Indigenous women across Canada. The four commissioned works were:
 Like it Was Yesterday by Calgary-based artists Jesse Gouchey and Xstine Cook 
 Snare by Vancouver-based Anishinaabe artist Lisa Jackson
 When it Rains by the Métis/Chippewa Cree filmmaker Cara Mumford 
 Your Courage Will Not Go Unnoticed by the Gitxsan/Lax Gibu artist and journalist Angela Sterritt

This was the first time the Festival partnered to present a simultaneous national exhibition. Working with Amnesty International Canada and Pattison Onestop, a national media company, the short videos were exhibited throughout Toronto's subway system, on display screens in 33 shopping centres across Canada, at the Calgary International Airport, and at the TIFF Bell Lightbox leading up to and during the 2012 imagineNATIVE Film + Media Arts Festival.

Zwei Indianer Aus Winnipeg
In 2009, the festival commissioned Zwei Indianer Aus Winnipeg, a short film by Saulteaux  filmmaker Darryl Nepinak. The film subsequently screened at the 2009 Berlinale.

Embargo Collective
In March 2008, imagineNATIVE formed the Embargo Collective, an international group of seven Indigenous artists for the purposes of collaborating and challenging one another to create seven new films. Collective members included Helen Haig-Brown, Heiltsuk/Mohawk filmmaker and actress Zoe Leigh Hopkins and Anishnaabe filmmaker Lisa Jackson. The resulting films were subsequently screened at the 2010 Berlinale. Following this, Brown's The Cave was awarded a top-ten recognition at the Toronto International Film Festival, and was screened at the 2011 Sundance Festival, while Jackson's Savage won a 2011 Genie Award for best live action short drama.

In 2014, Embargo Collective II focused on women filmmakers. It was curated by Danis Goulet, and included Hopkins, Blackfoot/Sami filmmaker Elle-Máijá Tailfeathers, Alethea Arnaquq-Baril and Caroline Monnet. Among the films produced that year was Roberta''.

Other programs

imagineNATIVE Film + Video Tour
The imagineNATIVE Film + Video Tour provides regional and remote communities access to Indigenous-made film and video from Canada and abroad. In addition to bringing a Festival-favourite feature presentation to these communities, the Tour encourages youth to explore the creation of film and video through a Youth-focused film and video program, discussion and hands-on video-making workshops. The video-making workshops assist and lead youth to create and edit short videos using readily-available technology such as cellphones and webcams.  The videos are featured on imagineNATIVE's website and open to public voting, sending the winner to Toronto for the imagineNATIVE Film + Media Arts Festival.

indigiFLIX Community Screening Series
The indigiFLIX Community Screening Series, presented by imagineNATIVE, is hosted in cultural and community centres to reach a broader First Nations, Métis, Inuit and non-Native audience beyond the annual Festival in Toronto. Films are selected from past imagineNATIVE Festivals in an effort to keep these important films alive and accessible to the Indigenous community. imagineNATIVE is committed to supporting artists through payment of industry-standard artist fees for all works presented.

Canadian Indigenous Film Producer Mini-Lab
The Canadian Indigenous Film Producer Mini-Lab was started as a program to develop skills and talent for emerging Indigenous producers. Among its alumni are Cara Mumford, Michelle Latimer and Jeremy Torrie.

See also

 American Indian Film Festival
 List of films featuring colonialism

References

External links 

Film festivals in Toronto
Indigenous film festivals in Canada
Indigenous film organizations in Canada
Indigenous organizations in Ontario
Film festivals established in 1999
1999 establishments in Ontario
Indigenous peoples in Toronto